Sabri Pilkati was an Albanian politician and mayor of Tirana in 1951, again from 1961-1962, and for a third time in 1965-1966.

References

Year of birth missing
Year of death missing
Mayors of Tirana